This is a list of people from Halifax, a town in West Yorkshire, England. They include actors, comedians, artists, television presenters, footballers and rugby players. A native of Halifax is referred to as a Haligonian, a demonym shared with Halifax in Novia Scotia. This list is arranged alphabetically by surname:


B
Tom Bailey, singer with Thompson Twins
Phyllis Bentley, novelist
Sarah Blackwood, singer with Dubstar
Bramwell Booth, former Salvation Army General
John Briercliffe, apothecary
Henry Briggs, mathematician

C
Alan Carter, Road racer 250cc. Youngest ever winner of a Grand Prix. Le Mans (1983)
Kenny Carter, Speedway Rider. British Champion 1984 1985. World Pairs champion 1983
John Reginald Halliday Christie, the murderer from 10 Rillington Place
Hannah Cockroft, athlete/double Paralympic gold medallist
Shirley Crabtree, wrestler professionally known as 'Big Daddy'

D
Jon Driver, scientist
George Dyson, composer

H
David Hartley, philosopher
Charlie Hodgson, rugby union fly half for England and Saracens
Nick Holmes, singer of the band Paradise Lost
Charles Horner, jeweller and inventor of the Dorcas thimble

I
Barrie Ingham, actor
 Chris Illingworth, pianist of the band Gogo Penguin

K
John Kettley, weather forecaster

L
Don Lang, musician
John Lawton, singer in the band Uriah Heep
Anne Lister, diarist and former owner of Shibden Hall

M
John Mackintosh, created Mackintosh's Toffee, which became Rowntree Mackintosh

N
Thomas Nettleton, local physician who carried out some of the earliest systematic programs of smallpox vaccination

P
 Wilfred Pickles – radio broadcaster, newsreader and host of Have a Go, born in Halifax
 Eric Portman – film and stage actor, born in  Ackroydon, Halifax

S
Sir Richard Saltonstall, colonist
Percy Shaw, inventor of Cat's Eyes, used on public roads
Ed Sheeran, singer-songwriter, born in Halifax
Oliver Smithies, geneticist, physical biochemist; Nobel prizewinner

W
John E. Walker, biochemist, Nobel prizewinner

References

Sources

Halifax, West Yorkshire
Halifax